Atropoides picadoi, also known as Picado's jumping pitviper, is a species of venomous snake, a pitviper in the subfamily Crotalinae of the family Viperidae. The species is endemic to Central America. There are no subspecies that are recognised as being valid. It is monotypic in the genus Atropoides.

Etymology
The specific name, picadoi, is in honor of Costa Rican herpetologist Clodomiro Picado Twight.

Description
A. picadoi is extremely stout, though not quite so much as A. mexicanus.

Geographic range
Atropoides picadoi is found in the mountains of Costa Rica and western Panama at  altitude. Its geographic range includes the Cordillera de Tilarán, the Cordillera Central, and the Cordillera de Talamanca. The type locality given is "La Palma, [San José Province], Costa Rica, 4500 feet".

References

Further reading
Dunn ER (1939). "A New Pit Viper from Costa Rica". Proceedings of the Biological Society of Washington 52: 165-166. (Trimeresurus nummifer picadoi, new subspecies).

External links